Juan Sebastián Cabal and Robert Farah were the defending champions, but chose to compete in Nice instead.
Steve Johnson and Sam Querrey won the title, defeating Raven Klaasen and Rajeev Ram in the final, 6–4, 6–1.

Seeds

Draw

Draw

References
 Main Draw

Doubles